Partisan Madonna of Minsk is a painting by Belarusian artist Mikhail Savitsky, completed in 1978 and preceded by similar painting, Partisan Madonna from 1967. The painting is based on the Sistine Madonna by Raphael Sanzio and reflects the motherhood and milieu of Soviet partisans during World War II. The painting is regarded by art critics as one of the best Belarusian paintings of the 20th century. Partisan Madonna of Minsk is housed in the Belarusian National Arts Museum in Minsk.

References

Paintings of people
Portraits of women
1978 paintings
20th-century allegorical paintings
Belarusian art
Paintings of the Madonna and Child
World War II in popular culture